Pierre Youssef El Daher (born 4 October 1957) is a Lebanese businessman and the CEO of the Lebanese Broadcasting Corporation International (LBCI) television.

Business life
Pierre El Daher has helped build the Arab TV industry from its fledgling beginnings almost 30 years ago to the large and growing sector it is today. His vision was born in the early 1980s when he pioneered the concept for the first private Lebanese TV station, which he hoped would bring entertainment and information to people around Lebanon and eventually the Arab World. It was under this vision that the Lebanese Broadcasting Corporation (LBC) was launched in 1985 setting the standards for professionalism in the Lebanese TV industry. Pierre El Daher's vision, however, did not stop with the Lebanese market and LBCI soon rose to become a regional and international broadcasting powerhouse, beaming its programming into homes across the region, European Union, United States, Canada, Americas and Australia as part of its satellite station LBC SAT. As LBCI continued to grow, El Daher expanded the station's team to become one of the most talented groups of producers, presenters, reporters and creatives in the region, joining with partners such as Al-Hayat and Rotana to offer the most-watched programming in the Arab world. El Daher also launched in 1997 production house PAC ltd, which was created to become an in-house production laboratory, and remained chairman and CEO until 2011. By the end of 2008, it was decided to increase the capital by a large margin. Accordingly, Al Waleed Bin Talal became the largest shareholder as he won the absolute majority in PAC and LBC SAT provided that the increase in capital would be invested to improve the programs network and upgrade productivity. In 2010, Rupert Murdoch joined the group and thus PAC and LBC SAT; however, the cooperation did not improve and develop the group. PAC was liquidated in 2012.

After long battles before international arbitration courts, he managed to win the lawsuits against Saudi Prince Al-Waleed Bin Talal. A lawsuit was finalized in February 2019, when ICC International Court of Arbitration in Paris issued an award in which the companies owned and controlled by Al Waleed Bin Talal lost the arbitrary proceedings filed against Pierre El Daher in person. The subject of the lawsuit is related to claims filed by several Rotana companies pursuant to the services agreement entered into on 22 February 2011 between Pierre El Daher and Rotana TV Company Ltd.

Today, as chairman of LBCI, El Daher continues to bring Arab audiences the best in television, while also dedicating his efforts to research in the media field and to media education for Arab students. El Daher made it to the list of Top 100 Most Powerful Arabs 2007 by Arabian Business. As CEO of LBCI and media executive, El Daher's wide range of activities include: Global Media AIDS Initiative at the UN headquarters, raising awareness and fighting AIDS, Rebuilding with Harris Corp. Iraq's media network, a project approved by the US administration in 2004, cooperating with UNICEF to highlight the children's voices via a series launched on LBCI named Sawtna, advising schools on matters related to the Communication and Information Studies program. Sheikh Pierre also launched "Cheyef 7alak" initiative, a civic movement with an ultimate goal of raising civil and social awareness, that is based on citizen journalism. It gives Lebanese citizen the power to report irresponsible and dangerous behaviors for a better Lebanon.

In March 2021, the Paris Court of Appeal upheld an ICC award, in which Al Waleed Bin Talal would be required to pay $22m to LBCI.

LBC ownership battle
The Lebanese Forces initiated proceedings in Lebanon claiming ownership of LBCI and alleging criminal violations by El Daher. The Court of Appeal rejected these claims but the Court of Cassation – Criminal Chamber decided to refer the case to the Sole Criminal Judge in Beirut. On 28 February 2019, Judge Fatima al-Jouni issued a decision dropping all charges against LBCI and Pierre El Daher in the lawsuit filed by the Lebanese Forces over the ownership of the TV channel, refuting all that has been submitted in evidence and ordering the Lebanese Forces party to pay all costs and expenses.

References

External links
LBCI Official site
Pierre El Daher biography
Pierre El Daher business life
Cheyef 7alak campaign

Lebanese Maronites
Businesspeople from Beirut
Living people
1957 births
Lebanese media executives
University of Southern California alumni